is a railway station located in the city of Tsugaru, Aomori Prefecture, Japan, operated by the East Japan Railway Company (JR East).  The station is a kan'i itaku station, administered by Goshogawara Station, and operated by Tsugaru municipal authority, with point-of-sales terminal installed. Ordinary tickets, express tickets, and reserved-seat tickets for all JR lines are on sale (no connecting tickets).

Lines
Mutsu-Morita Station is served by the Gonō Line.

Station layout
Mutsu-Morita Station has a dual opposed ground-level side platforms, but one platform is not in use, and the other serves bi-directional traffic. The station building is attended during normal daylight operating hours.

Platforms

History
Mutsu-Morita Station was opened on November 11, 1924 as a station on the Japanese Government Railways (JGR) in former Morita Village. With the privatization of the Japanese National Railways (successor of JGR) on April 1, 1987, it came under the operational control of JR East.

Passenger statistics
In fiscal 2016, the station was used by an average of 80 passengers daily (boarding passengers only).

Surrounding area

Morita Post office

See also
 List of Railway Stations in Japan

References

External links

  

Stations of East Japan Railway Company
Railway stations in Aomori Prefecture
Gonō Line
Tsugaru, Aomori
Railway stations in Japan opened in 1924